Mucilaginibacter carri is a Gram-negative, rod-shaped and obligately aerobic bacterium from the genus of Mucilaginibacter which has been isolated from a car air conditioning system in Korea.

References

External links
Type strain of Mucilaginibacter carri at BacDive -  the Bacterial Diversity Metadatabase

Sphingobacteriia
Bacteria described in 2016